Commander (Dr.) Abhilash Tomy, KC, NM is a retired Indian naval officer and yachtsman. In 2013, he became the first Indian to complete a solo, non-stop circumnavigation of the world under sail, and he also competed in the 2018 Golden Globe Race. On 10 January 2021, he retired from the Navy by applying for premature retirement from service as he wanted to focus on participating in the Golden Globe Race in 2022.

Early life and education
Abhilash Tomy is one of the two sons born to Lieutenant commander V. C. Tomy, a former Naval Officer, and Valsamma. Abhilash Tomy was born in Chethipuzha Hospital, Changanacherry in Kerala. Abhilash has a brother Aneesh Tomy. Upon completing his schooling, he joined the Naval Academy in Goa, from where he was commissioned into the navy in the year 2000. He completed his flying training in 2002, qualifying as a maritime reconnaissance pilot on the Dornier 228.

Sailing career 
Prior to his solo circumnavigation of the globe (which was called Sagar Parikrama 2), Tomy had represented India in several international events including the 2011 Cape Town to Rio Race, the 2014 Spanish Copa del Rey race and two successive Korea Cups.

In 2006, based on a proposal by Vice Admiral MP Awati, the navy authorised the construction of the INSV Mhadei, a sailboat, which was then sailed solo around the world by Cdr Dilip Donde in 2009-10, making four stops - Fremantle, Lyttelton, Port Stanley and Cape Town. This voyage was called the Sagar Parikrama, and Tomy was chosen as its shore support crew, helping Donde stock up supplies at the four ports.

Based on this experience, and his sailing expertise, he was chosen to helm Sagar Parikrama 2, a non-stop, unassisted circumnavigation of the globe, under sail. To prepare him for this role, in 2011, he and Cdr Dilip Donde participated in the Cape Town to Rio Race. On the return leg, Tomy sailed doubled handed from Rio to Cape Town and single handed from Cape Town to Goa. He also sailed to Malaysia and Thailand, with a team of three people.

On 1 November 2012, Tomy and the Mhadei departed from the Gateway of India at Mumbai. After completing a voyage of 23,100 nautical miles, he returned to Mumbai on 31 March 2013, having sailed around the Cape of Good Hope, Cape Horn and Cape Leeuwin.  He became the first Indian, second Asian, and 79th person to accomplish this feat. A ceremonial reception was given by the President of India Shri Pranab Mukherjee at the Gateway of India on 6 April 2013.

Tomy was a special invitee and the only Asian entrant in the 2018 edition of the solo non-stop round-the-world Golden Globe Race. After 82 days, while in 3rd position, Tomy's boat was damaged in a storm, and he suffered a severe injury to his spine. He was rescued after a multinational rescue effort.

He retired prematurely from the Indian Navy on 11 January 2021 to prepare for the 2022 Golden Globe Race.

Personal life
Abhilash Tomy is married to Urmimala Nag of West Bengal. The couple has two sons - Vedaant and Abhraneil.

Awards and decorations

 Kirti Chakra – 2013 (Second officer in the navy to be awarded KC)
 Nau Sena Medal 2019
 YAI Offshore Sailor of the Year 2009, 2013, 2018
 Amrita TV Award for Outstanding Human Endurance and Courage – 2013
 Tenzing Norgay National Adventure Award
 Only Indian in the International Association of Cape Horners
 Mac Gregor Medal for military reconnaissance – 2013
 CNS Commendation 2009
 National Maritime Foundation Award
 Doctor of Philosophy, h.c. from Jharkhand Rai University

Achievements
 First Indian and 2nd Asian to sail solo, non stop, around the earth
 Shore support for Sagar Parikrama I (Navy’s first solo circumnavigation expedition)
 Yacht Services Manager of Volvo Ocean Race 2008 stopover at Kochi
 Podium finishes in Korea Cup 2014 and 2015
 Bronze medal in YAI Nationals 2015
 Author of "151 Solitary Days at Sea, Sailing Non-stop, Around the World" & "Kadal Ottakku Kshanichappol"
 Formerly council member of the Yachting Association of India

External links
 Ted Talk: https://www.youtube.com/watch?v=jlAjbKyCFLY
 Sailing Across the Globe: https://www.youtube.com/watch?v=XiNYNpZI6Ok

References 

Single-handed circumnavigating sailors
Indian Navy officers
1979 births
Living people
Recipients of the Kirti Chakra
Recipients of the Tenzing Norgay National Adventure Award
Recipients of the MacGregor Medal
Indian naval aviators
Kirti Chakra
Recipients of the Nau Sena Medal